The Asheville Splash were a minor league women's soccer franchise, and members of the Atlantic Division of the W-League.  They changed their name from the Blue Ridge Rapids and began in 2001.  They played at Memorial Stadium in the city of Asheville, North Carolina. The team folded after the 2004 season.

Year-by-year

References

 Page on Western North Carolina athletics on newcomer.com - mentions details about Asheville Splash

External links
 web.archive.org copy of Official website

Women's soccer clubs in the United States
Defunct soccer clubs in North Carolina
Defunct USL W-League (1995–2015) teams
Sports in Asheville, North Carolina
2001 establishments in North Carolina
2004 disestablishments in North Carolina
Association football clubs established in 2001
Association football clubs established in 2004
Women's sports in North Carolina